The men's 20 kilometres walk event at the 1999 Summer Universiade was held in Palma de Mallorca, Spain.

Results

References

Athletics at the 1999 Summer Universiade
1999